Lev Stepanovich Sandakchiev (Лев Степанович Сандахчиев) (January 11, 1937, Rostov-on-Don — 29 June 2006, Novosibirsk, Koltsovo) was a Soviet and Russian scientist, specialist in molecular biology and virology, Doctor of biology, Professor, and Academician of Russian Academy of Science. 
He was the founder and the first head of State Research Center of Virology and Biotechnology VECTOR, director of it from 1982 to 2005.

Sources

1. Obituary. In memory of Lev Stepanovich Sandakchiev, Journal "Science in Siberia"  http://www.sbras.ru/HBC/article.phtml?nid=381&id=23
2. In memory of Lev Stepanovich Sandakchiev, Russian Academy of Science  http://www.ras.ru/win/db/show_per.asp?P=.id-1495.ln-ru

Academia in Russia
Russian biologists
1937 births
2006 deaths
20th-century biologists
Soviet biologists